Bennett Hillsman Henderson, (February 23, 1782October 12, 1849) was an American politician who represented Tennessee in the United States House of Representatives.

Biography
Henderson was born on February 23, 1782, in Bedford, Virginia son of William and Lockey Henderson. His family moved to Tennessee about 1790.  He was elected as a Democratic-Republican to the Fourteenth Congress, which lasted from March 4, 1815 to March 3, 1817. He served from December 4, 1815 to March 3, 1817.

Death
Henderson died in Summitville, Tennessee in 1849.

References

External links

1782 births
1849 deaths
Democratic-Republican Party members of the United States House of Representatives from Tennessee
19th-century American politicians